Francisco Javier "Fran" Álvarez Ferrer (born 4 September 1996) is a Spanish professional footballer who plays as a left back.

Career   
As a youth player, Álvarez joined the youth academy of Barcelona, but left due to injury.

On 4 March 2021, Álvarez debuted for KTP during a 6–1 defeat to HJK. On 14 May 2021, he scored his first goal for KTP in a 3–0 win over Haka.

Career statistics

References

External links  
 
 
 

 
1996 births
Living people
Sportspeople from Tarragona
Spanish footballers
Association football defenders
FC Barcelona players
La Roda CF players
FC Vilafranca players
Getafe CF B players 
U.S. Viterbese 1908 players
FC Schaffhausen players
Kotkan Työväen Palloilijat players
EC Granollers players
Championnat National 2 players
Segunda División B players 
Tercera División players 
Tercera Federación players 
Serie D players
Veikkausliiga players 
Spanish expatriate footballers 
Spanish expatriate sportspeople in France
Spanish expatriate sportspeople in Italy
Spanish expatriate sportspeople in Switzerland
Spanish expatriate sportspeople in Finland 
Expatriate footballers in France
Expatriate footballers in Italy
Expatriate footballers in Switzerland
Expatriate footballers in Finland
Footballers from Catalonia